Marshal-Admiral Paribatra Sukhumbandhu, Prince of Nakhon Sawan (Thai: สมเด็จพระเจ้าบรมวงศ์เธอ เจ้าฟ้าบริพัตรสุขุมพันธุ์ กรมพระนครสวรรค์วรพินิต) (1881–1944), was a highly influential Thai military officer and government minister in the early 20th century during the last years of the absolute monarchy. He served as Chief of Staff of the Royal Thai Army, Commander of the Royal Thai Navy, Naval Minister, Army Minister, Defense Minister, Interior Minister, and as a Privy Counsellor to both King Vajiravudh and King Prajadhipok.

Biography
Prince Paribatra was the 33rd child (and 13th son) of King Chulalongkorn (Rama V) by Queen Sukhumala Marasri. He joined his father for a journey to Europe in 1897, following which he entered the Prussian Cadet Corps to study at the Prussian Military academy at Groß-Lichterfelde.

Following his return to Siam, his half brother King Vajiravudh (Rama VI) appointed him Commander of the Royal Thai Navy, Minister of Marine and Minister of the Army. During the reign of King Prajadhipok (Rama VII), he was appointed Minister of Interior and was made member of the Supreme Council of the State of Siam, responsible for state affairs.

Prince Paribatra's considerable influence in the Siamese government was deemed as a threat by the Khana Ratsadon which organized the 1932 coup that ended the absolute monarchy in Siam. As a consequence, he was exiled from the kingdom to Bandung, Dutch East Indies, which was then under the Dutch administration. He died in 1944 while in exile, in Japanese-controlled Indonesia. His remains were repatriated by a Royal commission (a member of which was Prince Arjuna Suasti) in 1948.

A half-brother to two Thai kings, Prince Paribatra fathered eight children by his royal wife, Mom Chao (HSH Princess) Prasongsom Paribatra (Chaiyan). Two were sons, but only one, Chumbhotbongs Paribatra, lived to adulthood. Prince Paribatra also had a son with a commoner wife, Mom Somphan Paribatra na Ayudhaya (Palakawong), Prince Sukhumabhinanda - father of Mom Ratchawong Sukhumbhand Paribatra, the former governor of Bangkok.

Prince Paribatra's principal Bangkok residence until his forced exile in 1932 was the neo-baroque styled Bang Khun Prom Palace, constructed by architects Mario Tamagno and Karl Döhring. It later became the headquarters and subsequently museum of the Bank of Thailand.

Ancestry

See also
 Siamese coup d'état of 1932
 Supreme Council of State of Siam

References
 Paul M. Handley, "The King Never Smiles" Yale University Press: 2006, 
 http://freepages.genealogy.rootsweb.com/~royalty/thailand/i535.htm

|-

|-

|-

1881 births
1944 deaths
19th-century Thai people
Thai male Chao Fa
Paribatra family
Ministers of Defence of Thailand
Knights Grand Cordon of the Order of Chula Chom Klao
Knights of the Ratana Varabhorn Order of Merit
Knights Grand Commander (Senangapati) of the Order of Rama
Members of the Vallabhabhorn Order
Vajira Mala Order
Recipients of the Dushdi Mala Medal, Pin of Arts and Science
Children of Chulalongkorn
Field marshals of Thailand
Commanders-in-chief of the Royal Thai Army
Ministers of Interior of Thailand
Members of the Privy Council of Thailand
Thai exiles
Thai expatriates in Indonesia
Refugees in Indonesia
19th-century Chakri dynasty
20th-century Chakri dynasty
Sons of kings